Richard LeParmentier (July 16, 1946 – April 15, 2013) was an American actor who lived and worked primarily in the United Kingdom, best known for his role as Admiral Motti in Star Wars Episode IV: A New Hope (1977) and the acerbic police Lt. Santino in Who Framed Roger Rabbit (1988). He is credited under several variations of his name, including Richard Parmentier, Rick Le Parmentier and Richard LeParmentiere.

Early life
LeParmentier, born near Pittsburgh, Pennsylvania in the United States on July 16, 1946, grew up on a dairy farm. His father came from the isle of Guernsey and his mother from County Mayo in Ireland. LeParmentier lived in Hollywood, Florida during his teen years, and there his school drama-teacher suggested he become a professional actor. He attended a drama course at Wayne State University in Detroit, Michigan before moving to the United Kingdom in 1974.

Career

After appearing in a Fringe theatre production that was broadcast by the BBC, LeParmentier was granted an Equity union membership card and toured with the Incubus Theatre Company. His first film role was as lawyer Felix Hoffman in the 1974's Stardust and the following year he appeared in the film Rollerball. He also made numerous appearances on British television. His most prominent role was that of Admiral Motti, the arrogant, mocking Imperial officer who is choked by Darth Vader in Star Wars (1977), after Vader finds his "lack of faith disturbing". Mark Newbold, writing on the official Star Wars website, described the role as leaving "an indelible imprint on the Star Wars galaxy, helping to illustrate the fearsome powers of Lord Vader as well as the arrogance and malice of a bloated and over-confident Empire." LeParmentier had auditioned for the role of Han Solo, one of the film's main characters. The auditions for Star Wars were also used for Brian DePalma's Carrie and LeParmentier was cast as the high school principal in the latter. The film's production was delayed for nine months, so LeParmentier had to drop out of the role, with his role being recast to Stefan Gierasch. He was offered a two-line role as a customs officer in Star Wars, but deemed the part too small. Star Wars writer and director George Lucas cut the part, and the following month LeParmentier was cast as Motti. Additionally prior to gaining the role, LeParmentier was initially to portray a "Mos Eisley bureaucrat named Montross." However, before production began, the character was ultimately omitted from the film.

LeParmentier had a minor role in Superman II with his then-wife Sarah Douglas and Terence Stamp (who later portrayed Supreme Chancellor Valorum in Star Wars: Episode I – The Phantom Menace). He also had roles in films such as Octopussy (1983), which also featured another Star Wars actor, Jeremy Bulloch and Who Framed Roger Rabbit (1988) as Lt. Santino. His last screen role was in 1992, and from 1988 his focus became largely writing and producing. He wrote for several British television series including The Bill and Boon, with his writing partner Paddy Fletcher. He founded the production company Three Rivers Productions in 2008. LeParmentier became a "staple" of the Star Wars and science-fiction convention circuit, and made a cameo appearance in an online commercial for the 2012 Xbox 360 video game Kinect Star Wars, which re-created his famous scene from Star Wars. At the time of his death, he was working on Motti Now, a parody of Apocalypse Now, featuring other Star Wars alumni such as Kenneth Colley, Jeremy Bulloch, Garrick Hagon and Jerome Blake.

Personal life and death
From 1981 to 1984, LeParmentier was married to the British actress Sarah Douglas, who is best known for playing the role of Ursa in Superman and Superman II. The two appeared in several films together, including Rollerball, The People That Time Forgot, and Superman II. He had three children with his second wife, Cheryl Le Parmentier: Rhiannon (b. 1986), Stephanie and Tyrone. He was staying with them at the time of his death.

LeParmentier lived in Bath, Somerset, England. He died suddenly on April 15, 2013, while visiting his family in Austin, Texas, United States, aged 66.

Filmography

Film

Television

Video Games

Soldiers: Heroes of World War II (2004) (video game) (voice) - American Narrator

References

External links

Richard Le Parmentier official website

1946 births
2013 deaths
American emigrants to England
American people of Guernsey descent
American people of Irish descent
English male film actors
English male television actors
Male actors from Pennsylvania
People from Hollywood, Florida
Wayne State University alumni